The Roman Catholic Diocese of Porto Nacional is a diocese located in the city of Porto Nacional in the Ecclesiastical province of Palmas in Brazil.

History
 December 20, 1915: Established as Diocese of Porto Nacional from the Diocese of Goiás

Bishops
 Bishops of Porto Nacional (Roman rite)
Raymond Dominique Carrerot, O.P. † (30 July 1920 - 14 December 1933) Died
Alain Marie Hubert Antoine Jean Roland du Noday, O.P. † (21 March 1936 - 5 May 1976) Retired
Celso Pereira de Almeida, O.P. (5 May 1976 - 25 January 1995) Appointed, Bishop of Itumbiara
Geraldo Vieira Gusmão (23 December 1997 - 4 November 2009) Retired
Romualdo Matias Kujawski (4 November 2009 – present)

Coadjutor bishops
Celso Pereira de Almeida, O.P. (1975-1976)
Romualdo Matias Kujawski (2008-2009)

Auxiliary bishop
Celso Pereira de Almeida, O.P. (1972-1975), appointed Coadjutor here

Other priest of this diocese who became bishop
José Moreira da Silva, appointed Bishop of Januária, Minas Gerais in 2008

References
 GCatholic.org
 Catholic Hierarchy

Roman Catholic dioceses in Brazil
Christian organizations established in 1915
Porto Nacional, Roman Catholic Diocese of
Roman Catholic dioceses and prelatures established in the 20th century